José Antonio Pikabea Larrarte (born 26 September 1970), also known as Kote, is a Spanish former footballer who played as a central defender.

Club career
Born in Hondarribia, Basque Country, Pikabea joined Real Sociedad's youth system at the age of 17, going on to spend four seasons with their reserves. On 8 March 1992 he made his La Liga debut, playing 21 minutes in a 2–1 away win against Valencia CF; his first appearance was handed by John Toshack.

Still under the Welsh manager, Pikabea became an undisputed starter for the Gipuzkoa side from the 1992–93 campaign onwards. In 1997–98, he only missed two league games and totalled 3,214 minutes of action as the team finished in third position, thus qualifying for the UEFA Cup.

During most of his spell, Pikabea often partnered another Real Sociedad youth graduate, Loren. A continuous loss of form made him appear in just six matches in his penultimate season (again with Toshack, who was having his third stint as head coach), and none whatsoever in his last, with French Raynald Denoueix on the bench. He retired in June 2003 at nearly 33, having taken part in 313 competitive games for his only club.

See also
List of one-club men

References

External links

1970 births
Living people
People from Hondarribia
Spanish footballers
Footballers from the Basque Country (autonomous community)
Association football defenders
La Liga players
Segunda División B players
Real Sociedad B footballers
Real Sociedad footballers
Basque Country international footballers